Spark to a Flame:  The Very Best of Chris de Burgh is the third compilation album by Chris de Burgh, released by A&M Records in 1989.  The album was released largely to capitalise on the resurgence of de Burgh's career after the smash hit of The Lady in Red three years earlier.  As a result, most of the tracks are drawn from his 1980s albums The Getaway, Man on the Line, Into The Light and Flying Colours.  Only "Spanish Train" and "A Spaceman Came Travelling" come from de Burgh's early output from the 1970s.

Also notable is the pairing of the songs "Borderline" and "Say Goodbye To It All" – originally from two different albums, which tell a story arc of a conscientious objector fleeing to be with his lover.

Track listing
All songs written by Chris de Burgh.

UK release
"This Waiting Heart" (previously unreleased) – 4:08
"Don't Pay the Ferryman" – 3:24
"Much More Than This" – 2:55
"Sailing Away" – 4:58
"The Lady in Red" – 4:17
"Borderline" – 4:33
"Say Goodbye to It All" – 5:04
"Spanish Train" – 4:47
"Ship to Shore" – 3:47
"Missing You" – 4:06
”Fatal Hesitation“ – 4:14
"Diamond in the Dark" (previously unreleased) – 3:29
"Tender Hands" – 4:28
"A Spaceman Came Travelling" * – 5:10
"Where Peaceful Waters Flow" – 3:53
"High on Emotion" – 4:24

US/Canada release
"This Waiting Heart" (previously unreleased) – 4:08
"Don't Pay the Ferryman" – 3:24
"Much More Than This" – 2:55
"Sailing Away" – 4:58
"The Lady in Red" – 4:17
"Borderline" – 4:33
"Say Goodbye to It All" – 5:04
"Spanish Train" – 4:47
"Patricia the Stripper" – 3:30
"Ship to Shore" – 3:47
"Missing You" – 4:06
"Diamond in the Dark" (previously unreleased) – 3:29
"Tender Hands" – 4:28
"A Spaceman Came Travelling" – 5:10
"Where Peaceful Waters Flow" – 3:53
"High on Emotion" – 4:24

West German/Australasian release
"This Waiting Heart" (previously unreleased) – 4:08
"Don't Pay the Ferryman" – 3:24
"Fire on the Water" – 4:28
"Sailing Away" – 4:58
"The Lady in Red" – 4:17
"Borderline" – 4:33
"Say Goodbye to It All" – 5:04
"One Word (Straight to the Heart)" – 4:16
"A Spaceman Came Travelling" – 5:10
"Ship to Shore" – 3:47
"Missing You" – 4:06
"Diamond in the Dark" (previously unreleased) – 3:29
"Tender Hands" – 4:28
"The Getaway" – 3:52
"Where Peaceful Waters Flow" – 3:53
"High on Emotion" – 4:24

 The album features the remixed version of A Spaceman Came Travelling with a re-rerecorded vocal track, it is subsequently titled A Spaceman Came Travelling '89 on later compilations.

Charts

Sales and certifications

External links
 The Official Chris de Burgh Website

Chris de Burgh albums
1989 greatest hits albums
Albums produced by Rupert Hine
Albums produced by Roy Thomas Baker
A&M Records compilation albums